The Emirates ID (United Arab Emirates Resident Identity Card) is the United Arab Emirates'  identity card issued and operated by the Federal Authority for Identity and Citizenship. Enrollment in the program is mandatory by law for all Citizens and Residents of the UAE.

Registration & Cost 
Citizens and residents inside the UAE must register into the program. Infants born in the UAE are issued a card at birth, though biometrics (including fingerprint and retina scan) are only captured after the card holder turns 15.

The card costs AED 170 for one year validity or AED 270 for two year validity for UAE Citizens. Expatriates are charged AED 100 per year of validity with the maximum years being capped at the expiry of their current visa.

Uses 
The Emirates ID card is the only identity document (except passports) accepted by all government agencies in the UAE. It serves as a digital signature of the holder and is required for entering into telecom, utility and lease agreements. The Central Bank of the United Arab Emirates announced that all personal bank accounts in the country will require a valid Emirates ID effective February 2019.

The Emirates ID is also one of the accepted documents for electronic border crossings at all UAE International Airports. Smartpass, an electronic identity application developed by the Telecommunications Regulatory Authority (TRA) utilizes data from the Emirates ID to verify users' identity across all UAE Government Entities.

References 

Dubai ID
Currencies of the United Arab Emirates